Hidaka is a Japanese surname. Notable people with the surname include:

, Japanese World War II flying ace
, Japanese serial killer
, Japanese professional wrestler
, Japanese footballer
, Japanese actress
, Japanese singer, rapper, actor and dancer
, Imperial Japanese Navy officer
, Japanese voice actress
, Japanese footballer
, Japanese voice actress
, Japanese baseball player
, Imperial Japanese Navy admiral
, Japanese actress
, Japanese baseball player
, Japanese footballer
, Japanese footballer
, Japanese footballer
, Japanese footballer

Fictional characters
, a character in the manga series New Game!
, a character in the media franchise Weiß Kreuz
, a character in the anime series Creamy Mami, the Magic Angel
, a character in the manga series Hikaru no Go

Japanese-language surnames